Scissurella mirifica is a species of minute sea snail, a marine gastropod mollusk or micromollusk in the family Scissurellidae, the little slit snails.

Description
The size of the shell varies between 1.2 mm and 2.5 mm. The depressed shell has an oval shape. The flattened spire has a very wide and open umbilicus. The entire surface of the 2½ whorls is regularly and delicately finely clathrate. The aperture is very oblique. The outer lip recedes inwards.

Distribution
This marine species occurs off the Philippines, Indonesia, Papua New Guinea, Solomon Islands, Fiji and the Society Islands; off Queensland, Australia.

References

 Jansen, P., 1999. The Australian Scissurellidae. Conchiglia, 31(291):47-55.
 Geiger D.L. & Jansen P. (2004). New species of Australian Scissurellidae (Mollusca: Gastropoda: Vetigastropoda) with remarks on Australian and Indo-Malayan species. Zootaxa 714:1-72

External links
 To Encyclopedia of Life
 To World Register of Marine Species
 

Scissurellidae
Gastropods described in 1862